Brian Baird (1929–1998) was a newsreader that worked for the Northern Ireland television channel UTV during the 1970s and well into the 1980s, and a teacher and lecturer at Stranmillis Teacher Training College. He also worked for a time for the BBC Radio in Belfast, and was a past president of the Ulster Society of Rugby Football Referees.

Belfast-born Brian Baird started his career in 1956 as an English teacher in Kuala Kangsar, a small town in Malaysia, after answering a newspaper advertisement seeking Education Officers for teaching work abroad. Five years later, he moved with his wife Stella to the island of Penang, where his son Patric Baird was born, before returning to Belfast in 1963. Then, for many years, he was the face and the voice of the Ulster Television news report. He died in 1998 after a long illness.

References 

1929 births
1998 deaths
20th-century Irish people
Irish radio presenters
UTV (TV channel)
BBC Northern Ireland